The 2004 Baton Rouge mayoral election was held on September 18 and November 2, 2004, to elect the mayor-president of Baton Rouge, Louisiana. It saw Democrat Kip Holden unseat incumbent Republican Bobby Ray Simpson.

Results

First round

Runoff

References 

2004 Louisiana elections
2004
Baton Rouge